On Behalf of the Streets is the debut album from J. Stalin.

Track listing 
 Intro
 Actin Like... (featuring Laroo)
 So Cold
 That's My Name
 I Was Told (featuring G-Stack)
 Party Jumpin (featuring The Jacka)
 The Function
 Fuck U (featuring Mayback & Tamika)
 Keep a Banger (featuring Polo)
 808
 Get It Like Me (featuring Shady Nate & Nijay)
 Put Cha Hands Up
 Everyday (featuring Mistah F.A.B.)
 2 Pistols (featuring Husalah & Shady Nate)
 In a Zone (featuring Keak da Sneak & Bavgate)
 Reality (featuring Kaz Kyzah)
 Banga Dance (featuring Shady Nate & Jay Jonah)
 No One (featuring Shady Nate)

References
http://www.amazon.com/Behalf-Streets-J-Stalin/dp/B000HT3768

2006 debut albums
J. Stalin albums
SMC Recordings albums
Thizz Entertainment albums